Ernest Harold Stephens (born October 30, 1938) is a former American football quarterback who played one season with the New York Titans of the American Football League. He played college football at Hardin–Simmons University and attended Abilene High School in Abilene, Texas. He won the Sammy Baugh Trophy in 1960.

References

External links
Just Sports Stats
Fanbase profile

Living people
1938 births
Players of American football from Texas
American football quarterbacks
Hardin–Simmons Cowboys football players
New York Titans (AFL) players
People from Taylor County, Texas